Jón Jónsen (24 August 1896 – 30 October 1981) was an Icelandic long-distance runner from Reykjavik. He competed for Denmark in the men's 5000 metres at the 1920 Summer Olympics.

References

1896 births
1981 deaths
Sportspeople from Reykjavík
Danish male long-distance runners
Icelandic male cross country runners
Icelandic male long-distance runners
Danish male cross country runners
Olympic athletes of Denmark
Athletes (track and field) at the 1920 Summer Olympics
Olympic cross country runners